Álvaro José Arroyo González (also known as Joe Arroyo or El Joe; 1 November 1955 – 26 July 2011) was a Colombian salsa and tropical music singer, composer and songwriter. He was considered one of the greatest performers of Caribbean music in his country and Latin America.

Life and career

1955–1971: Early life 
Joe Arroyo was born and raised in the neighborhood Nariño in Cartagena. Arroyo's singing career began very early, when at the age of eight he sang in brothels in Tesca, a red-light zone in his hometown. In the beginning he sang with groups like "Los Caporales del Magdalena", "Manuel Villanueva y su Orquesta", "La Protesta" and "Super Combo Los Diamantes", in 1971 he recorded with "La Promiscua". As is mentioned, pronounced, remarked, and showed by him in some of his songs "...En la Plaza de Majagual, Sincelejo..." Joe did concerts as a young singer in this city, place, downtown.

1971–2000: Early career 
In 1971 Arroyo had his biggest opportunity of becoming a nationally known artist. He was discovered by Julio Ernesto Estrada, the bass player and director of the band Fruko y sus Tesos and signed up with Colombian record label Discos Fuentes. With Fruko, El Joe recorded timeless classics such as "Tania" and "Manyoma". 

He performed with the band for ten years until 1981 when he began his solo career leading his  band, named "La Verdad" (The truth).

Joe Arroyo became very successful by mixing salsa, cumbia, porro, soca, compas (or konpa), zouk and other music from the African Diaspora in a unique style. Some of his most famous songs are "Rebelión", "La Noche", "Tania", "El Ausente" and "En Barranquilla Me Quedo".

2000–2011: Health issues 
Arroyo was forced to cancel several performances due to his health problems. On more than one occasion, he was thought to be dead because of his abrupt absences from media attention. Joe Arroyo had to go through surgery because of problems with his eyes.

He was once seriously ill for about three months due to a problem with his thyroid, even though many had attributed it to drug abuse, which the singer denied in Rolling Stone magazine, Argentina in January 2004.

Death 
Arroyo died in Barranquilla on 26 July 2011, after spending nearly a month in hospital due to multiorgan failure. During his stay in the hospital his health deteriorated. The day before his death, doctors announced the singer was suffering from several organ failures including renal and heart failure and he was given his final sacrament by the local bishop. The singer died at 7:45 local time.

Legacy 

Between June and December 2011 the RCN channel broadcast a soap opera based on the singer's life called El Joe, la leyenda (The Joe, the legend). On 9 November 2011, Shakira was honored as Latin Recording Academy Person of the Year and performed a cover of Arroyo's song "En Barranquilla Me Quedo" at the Mandalay Bay Events Center as a tribute to the singer. A three-meter tall bronze and copper statue of Arroyo was unveiled in Cartagena, Colombia in 2013.

Discography

Arroyando (1981)
Con Gusto y Gana (1981)
El Campeón (1982)
Actuando (1983)
Hasta Amanecé (1984)
Me le Fugué a la Candela (1985)
Musa Original (1986)
Echao Pa' Lante (1987)
Fuego En Mi Mente (1988)
En Acción (1989)
La Guerra de los Callados (1990)
Toque de Clase (1991)
Fuego (1993)
Sus Razones Tendrá (1994)
Mi Libertad (1995)
Reinando en Vida (1996)
Deja Que Te Cante (1997)
Cruzando el Milenio (1998)
En Sol Mayor (1999)
Marcando Terreno (2001)
Se Armo la Moña en Carnaval (2005)
El Súper Joe (2007)

Awards and nominations

Latin Grammy Awards 
A Latin Grammy Award is an accolade by the Latin Academy of Recording Arts & Sciences to recognize outstanding achievement in the music industry. Joe Arroyo received two nominations, and in 2011 he was presented with a posthumous career award.

|-
| 2000 || En Sol Mayor || Best Traditional Tropical Album || 
|-
| 2008 || El Súper Joe || Best Contemporary Tropical Album || 
|-
| 2011 || Special Awards (Posthumous) || Lifetime Achievement Award || 
|-

Legacy 
 Geotrigona joearroyoi, a newly discovered species of bee in Colombia is named in honour of Joe Arroyo

See also 

 Fruko y sus Tesos
 Grupo Niche
 The Latin Brothers

References

External links 

 Info and images
 Video of Joe Arroyo
  El Joe fue 'la rebelión' – El Tiempo

1955 births
2011 deaths
People from Cartagena, Colombia
21st-century Colombian male singers
Latin American folk singers
Salsa musicians
Tropical musicians
Latin Grammy Lifetime Achievement Award winners
Latin music songwriters
Colombian people of African descent
20th-century Colombian male singers